The 2022 Tour Championship (officially the 2022 Cazoo Tour Championship) was a professional snooker tournament that took place from 28 March to 3 April 2022 at Venue Cymru in Llandudno, Wales. Organised by the World Snooker Tour, it comprised the top eight players on the one-year ranking list. It was the fourth edition of the Tour Championship, first held in 2019, and the 15th and penultimate ranking event of the 2021–22 snooker season, following the Gibraltar Open and preceding the World Championship. It was the third and final event of the season's Cazoo Series, following the Players Championship and the World Grand Prix. Broadcast by ITV4 in the United Kingdom, the event featured a prize fund of £380,000, of which the winner received £150,000.

The defending champion was Neil Robertson, who had defeated Ronnie O'Sullivan 10–4 in the 2021 final. Robertson retained his title, coming from 4–9 behind in the final to defeat John Higgins 10–9 and win his 23rd ranking tournament, putting him level with Judd Trump at sixth place on the all-time list of ranking event winners. Robertson also won the season's Cazoo Cup, while Higgins lost his fifth final of the season.

The event produced 33 century breaks, with Trump making the tournament's highest break of 140. O'Sullivan made five century breaks in both his quarter-final and semi-final matches, becoming the first player to make five centuries in two consecutive matches.

Format
The 2022 Tour Championship (officially the 2022 Cazoo Tour Championship) was the third and final event in the 2021–22 Cazoo Cup series, first introduced in the 2018–19 snooker season; the other events in the series were the World Grand Prix and the Players Championship. Organised by the World Snooker Tour, it was the 15th and penultimate ranking event of the 2021–22 snooker season, following the Gibraltar Open and preceding the World Championship. The Tour Championship featured the top eight players from the one-year ranking list taking part in a single-elimination tournament. All matches were played as the best of 19 .

The event took place at the Venue Cymru in Llandudno, Wales, between 28 March and 3 April 2022. Broadcast by ITV4 in the United Kingdom, it was sponsored by car retailer Cazoo. The defending champion was Neil Robertson, who won the 2021 event, defeating Ronnie O'Sullivan 10–4 in the final.

Qualification 
The participants were determined by the points won in the ranking tournaments preceding the Tour Championship, from the 2021 Championship League to the 2022 Gibraltar Open.

Prize fund 
The total prize fund for the event was £380,000, with the winner receiving £150,000. A breakdown of the prize money for the event is shown below:
 Winner: £150,000
 Runner-up: £60,000
 Semi-final: £40,000
 Quarter-final: £20,000
 Highest break: £10,000
 Total: £380,000

Summary

Quarter-finals 

The quarter-finals were held between 28 and 31 March. Zhao Xintong, who had won the UK Championship and German Masters earlier in the season, made his debut against John Higgins, who narrowly qualified for the tournament after both Ricky Walden and Kyren Wilson were unable to win enough points during the Gibraltar Open. Zhao won four consecutive frames, making two centuries of 108 and 124, to take a 5–2 lead, but Higgins won the last frame of the session. In the second session, Zhao won three of the first four frames to move 8–4 ahead, but he scored just 53 points across the next four frames as Higgins drew level at 8–8. Higgins won the 17th to take a 9–8 lead, but Zhao won the 18th to set up a decider. Higgins clinched a 10–9 victory after Zhao missed a four-ball . In all, Higgins won six of the last seven frames. Afterward, he called coming from behind to beat Zhao "one of my best wins ever".

In the second quarter-final, the season's English Open and Players Championship winner Robertson faced the Northern Ireland Open champion Mark Allen. Robertson took a 7–0 lead, with Allen scoring just 55 points in the first seven frames, but Allen avoided a session whitewash by winning the eighth frame. In the evening session, Allen won five of the first six, before Robertson produced back-to-back centuries of 121 and 130 to win the match 10–6. Afterward, Robertson stated that the match had reassured him he could respond strongly against a comeback. 

In the third quarter-final, O'Sullivan faced Mark Williams, who had not defeated O'Sullivan in a two-session ranking match since the semi-finals of the 2000 UK Championship. Williams won the 29-minute opening frame, but O'Sullivan then won three consecutive frames, making a 131 break in the fourth, to lead 3–1 at the mid-session interval. Williams won the fifth, but O'Sullivan made a 128 break to take the sixth. O'Sullivan led by 50 points in the seventh, but Williams made a 92 clearance to win the frame. O'Sullivan took the last frame of the session with an 89 break to lead 5–3. Williams began the evening session with a 103 break, but O'Sullivan responded with a 100 in the tenth. Williams made an 89 break to win the 11th, but O'Sullivan took the 12th with a 75 to lead 7–5. Williams won two consecutive frames after the mid-session interval to level at 7–7, and then took a 24-point lead in the 15th before accidentally potting the pink when  into the pack of reds. O'Sullivan restored his lead at 8–7 with a 106 break. Williams leveled again at 8–8, but O'Sullivan made a 127 in the 17th frame, his fifth century of the match, to lead 9–8. Williams fell 47 points behind in the penultimate frame, but won it on the colours to force a decider. Both players had chances, but O'Sullivan clinched the match after Williams missed a long pot on the final red. The quality of the match was widely praised, with media calling it a "classic", an "epic", and a "thriller". "It is probably the best he has ever played against me and the best I’ve ever played against him”, stated O’Sullivan. Williams responded that he enjoyed the quality of the match, but said "I could and should have won".

In the last quarter-final, Judd Trump faced Luca Brecel, who also made his debut in the event. Trump had entered the top eight on the season's money list by winning the Turkish Masters earlier that month, while Brecel had been runner-up at the UK Championship and won the Scottish Open earlier in the season. Brecel won six of the first eight frames, making a century and four other  breaks in the first session, while Trump made just one break over 50. The first four frames of the evening session were shared. Trump then made back-to-back centuries of 140 (the tournament's highest break) and 103, but Brecel won the next two to clinch a 10–6 win. It was Brecel's first victory over Trump in a ranking event, and only his second victory over Trump in ten meetings.

Semi-finals 

The semi-finals were held on 1 and 2 April. O'Sullivan faced Robertson in a match that reprised the 2019 and 2021 finals. Robertson made a 115 break in the opening frame, but O'Sullivan won four consecutive frames with breaks of 125, 90, 106 and 128 to take a 4–1 lead. Robertson won the last three frames of the session to tie the scores at 4–4. O'Sullivan won the first frame of the second session, before Robertson won the next three to lead 7–5. O'Sullivan won three of the next four to tie the match at 8–8. O'Sullivan went ahead with a 112 break in the next frame, his fifth century of the match, but Robertson won the final two frames to clinch the match 10–9, guaranteeing that he would win the Cazoo Cup, regardless of the outcome of the final, having won the Players Championship and been runner-up in the World Grand Prix, the other two Cazoo Series events.  O'Sullivan became the first player to make five century breaks in two consecutive matches. The 19-frame match had only two frames without at least a half-century break. By reaching the semi-finals, O'Sullivan replaced Mark Selby as world number one after the event, although O'Sullivan called Robertson "the best player in the world".

In the second semi-final, Higgins played Brecel. The players had faced each other in the Scottish Open final earlier in the season, with Brecel winning 9–5 on that occasion. Brecel won the first three frames, but Higgins responded with five frames in a row, ending with a century break of 108, to finish the first session with a 5–3 lead. Higgins moved 7–4 ahead in the evening session before Brecel won three frames in a row to level the scores at 7–7. However, Higgins responded by also winning three frames in a row, taking advantage of errors by Brecel, to win the match 10–7 and reach the 55th ranking final of his professional career.

Final 

The final took place on 3 April between Robertson and Higgins, as a best-of-19-frame match played over two sessions. The players met in a ranking final for the second time that season, with Robertson having defeated Higgins 9–8 in the English Open final in November 2021. The first frame lasted over 50 minutes, the longest of the tournament, with Higgins winning it on the final black. Higgins then made back-to-back century breaks of 136 and 126 to lead 3–0. Robertson responded with a 130 in the fourth and also won the fifth. In frame six, Robertson attempted a maximum break, but missed the final . Higgins made his third century break of the match in frame seven, and also won frame eight with a break of 80 to lead 5–3. The players made five century breaks in the first eight frames. 

In the evening session, Higgins won the first three frames to lead 8–3, before Robertson responded with a 91 to take frame 12. Higgins took the 13th with an 84 break, but Robertson came from 4–9 behind to win six consecutive frames and secure a 10–9 victory. The 23rd ranking title of Robertson's career, it put him level with Trump in sixth place on the all-time list of ranking event winners. Robertson called his win "the best comeback of my career". It was Higgins's fifth loss in a major final that season, following defeats at the English Open, Northern Ireland Open, Champion of Champions, and Scottish Open. It was also the third time in the season that Higgins had lost a ranking final after requiring just one frame for victory. He led 8–6 in both the English and Northern Ireland Opens, only to lose 8–9 each time.

Tournament draw 
The draw for the event is shown below. Players in bold denote match winners,with numbers in brackets showing players seeding.

Final
The scores from the final is shown below. Scores in brackets are breaks made by players in each frame.

Century breaks 
A total of 33 century breaks were made during the tournament.

 140, 103  Judd Trump
 136, 127, 126, 108  John Higgins
 131, 128, 128, 127, 125, 112, 106, 106, 100, 100  Ronnie O'Sullivan
 130, 130, 129, 125, 125, 121, 117, 115, 108, 103  Neil Robertson
 128, 124, 108  Zhao Xintong
 108, 105, 100  Luca Brecel
 103  Mark Williams

Cazoo Series
The Cazoo Series features three events: the World Grand Prix, the Players Championship, and the Tour Championship. For all three events, qualification is based on players' rankings on the one-year ranking list. Coming into the final event, only O'Sullivan and Neil Robertson were in contention to top the series earnings. However, O'Sullivan was defeated by Robertson in the semi-finals, meaning that Robertson was guaranteed to top the series rankings. The top ten players in the Cazoo Cup series are shown below. Prizes in bold denote an event win.

References

Tour Championship (snooker)
Tour Championship
Tour Championship
Tour Championship
Tour Championship
Tour Championship
Llandudno